Edward Burlton Heusser (May 7, 1909 – March 1, 1956) was an American professional baseball pitcher whose 20-season (1929–1948) pro career included 266 games pitched in Major League Baseball (MLB) over nine seasons for the St. Louis Cardinals (1935–1936), Philadelphia Phillies (1938 and 1948), Philadelphia Athletics (1940) and Cincinnati Reds (1943–1946). In , he led the National League in earned run average with a sparkling 2.38 mark in 192 innings pitched. He earned the colorful nickname of "The Wild Elk of Wasatch".

Heusser was born in Salt Lake County, Utah.

Of his 266 career appearances, 104 were starts. He posted 50 complete games and ten shutouts, with 19 saves recorded as a relief pitcher. He compiled a 56–67 won–lost record with a 3.69 earned run average. In 1,087 career innings pitched, he permitted 1,167 hits and 300 bases on balls. He struck out 299. He also was an above-average hitting pitcher during his nine-year MLB career, with a .206 batting average (69-for-335) with 32 runs scored, three home runs and 24 RBIs.  During his 12 years in the minors, he won 20 games once and 19 games twice, all in higher-level classifications.

Ed Heusser died from cancer in Aurora, Colorado, at the age of 46.

See also
 List of Major League Baseball annual ERA leaders

References

External links

1909 births
1956 deaths
Atlanta Crackers players
Baseball players from Salt Lake City
Birmingham Barons players
Cincinnati Reds players
Columbus Red Birds players
Danville Veterans players
Deaths from cancer in Colorado
Elmira Red Wings players
Fort Wayne Chiefs players
Houston Buffaloes players
Knoxville Smokies players
Los Angeles Angels (minor league) players
Major League Baseball pitchers
Memphis Chickasaws players
Montreal Royals players
National League ERA champions
Philadelphia Athletics players
Philadelphia Phillies players
Rochester Red Wings players
St. Louis Cardinals players